Jesper Piitulainen (born 13 August 1991) is a Finnish ice hockey forward currently playing for Mikkelin Jukurit of the Finnish Liiga.

References

External links
 

1991 births
Living people
SaiPa players
Lukko players
Finnish ice hockey forwards
Mikkelin Jukurit players
People from Savonlinna
Sportspeople from South Savo